The 1951 Bowling Green Falcons football team was an American football team that represented Bowling Green State University as an independent during the 1951 college football season. In their 11th season under head coach Robert Whittaker, the Falcons compiled a 4–4–1 record and were outscored by all opponents by a combined total of 178 to 150.

The team's statistical leaders were Rex Simonds with 506 passing yards, fullback Fred Durig with 1,444 rushing yards, and Jim Ladd with 236 receiving yards. Durig's 1,444 rushing yards stood as a Bowling Green single season record until 1974. Ollie Glass and Eugene Aldridge were the team captains. Durig received the team's Most Valuable Player award.

Schedule

References

Bowling Green
Bowling Green Falcons football seasons
Bowling Green Falcons football